Necesito Más de Ti ("I Need More Of You") is the title of a studio album released by Regional Mexican band Duelo. This album became their first number-one set on the Billboard Top Latin Albums.

Track listing
The track listing from Billboard.

Charts

Weekly charts

Year-end charts

References

2009 albums
Duelo albums
Fonovisa Records albums